Pseudopostega gracilis is a moth of the family Opostegidae. It is only known from primary rainforest in north-eastern French Guiana.

The length of the forewings is 2.3–2.5 mm. Adults are mostly white. Adults have been collected in January.

Etymology
The species name is derived from the Latin gracilis (slender) in reference to the extremely slender caudal process of the male gnathos.

External links
A Revision of the New World Plant-Mining Moths of the Family Opostegidae (Lepidoptera: Nepticuloidea)

Opostegidae
Moths described in 2007